Abrosimovo is a rural locality (a selo) in Dyachenkovskoye Rural Settlement of Bogucharsky District, Voronezh Oblast, Russia. The population was 94 as of 2010. There are 2 streets.

Geography 
Abrosimovo is located 31 km southeast of Boguchar (the district's administrative centre) by road. Dedovka is the nearest rural locality.

References 

Rural localities in Rostov Oblast